Lambis crocata, commonly known as the orange spider conch, is a species of large sea snail, a marine gastropod mollusk in the family Strombidae, the true conchs.

Description

The size of an adult shell varies between 70 mm and 205 mm and it is a mixture of orange and white color.

Distribution
This species is found in the Indian Ocean along the coasts of Aldabra, Chagos, the Comores, Kenya, Madagascar, the Mascarene Basin, Mauritius, Mozambique, Réunion, the Seychelles and Tanzania.

References

 Dautzenberg, Ph. (1929). Mollusques testacés marins de Madagascar. Faune des Colonies Francaises, Tome III
 Spry, J.F. (1961). The sea shells of Dar es Salaam: Gastropods. Tanganyika Notes and Records 56
 Walls, J.G. (1980). Conchs, tibias and harps. A survey of the molluscan families Strombidae and Harpidae. T.F.H. Publications Ltd, Hong Kong.

External links
 

Strombidae
Gastropods described in 1807